Jean-Marc Bonnet-Bidaud (born 1950) is a French astrophysicist at the Atomic Energy and Alternative Energies Commission (CEA). He is a specialist in high-energy astrophysics and in the study of highly condensed stars in the galaxy (white dwarfs, neutron stars and black holes). He is also active in the field of the history of astronomy and in charge of the public outreach for astronomy at CEA.

Scientific work 
Among his highest citation scientific papers are the discovery and collaborative study of an atypical supernova observed in 2006, a scientific review on the enigmatic X-ray source  Cygnus X-3 and its reported very high energy emission  and the discovery of abnormal CNO abundances among accreting magnetic white dwarfs.

History of science 
Bonnet-Bidaud is the author of the first scientific study of the oldest known stellar map, the Dunhuang Star Chart, also known as the S.3326 manuscript, a document found in China along the Silk road and now kept at the British Library in London, England. The study concludes to a now revised datation at +650-685, making the chart contemporary of the early Tang Dynasty and most probably produced by the famous Chinese astronomer Li Chunfeng.

Bibliography

Books 
 4000 ans d'astronomie chinoise(2017)
 Variations sur un même ciel (2012) with Aurélien Barrau and Michel Cassé  
 Le Soleil dans la peau (2012) with Alain Froment, Patrick Moureaux and Aymeric Petit 
 Un autre cosmos ? (2012)  
 Le big bang n'est pas une théorie comme les autres (2009) with François-Xavier Désert, Dominique Leglu and Gilbert Reinisch 
 Etoiles dans la nuit des temps (2009) 
 Daniel Pontoreau (2002) with Ann Hindry and Luc Lang 
 L'Etat des Sciences (1991)

Films 
 The Dunhuang star chart (2009) with Jérôme Blumberg, CNRS Images
 Enigmes de Sirius (2008) with Jérôme Blumberg, CNRS Images
 Sirius, the Dogon star (1999) with Jérôme Blumberg, CNRS Images media-FEMIS-CICT

References

External links 
 Personal website of Jean-Marc Bonnet-Bidaud
 Scientific publications from the NASA database ADS
 Variations sur un même ciel
 Le Soleil dans la peau
 Un autre cosmos ?
 Le big bang n'est pas une théorie comme les autres
 The Dunhuang star chart
 Enigmes de Sirius
 Sirius, the Dogon star

20th-century French astronomers
1950 births
Living people
French astrophysicists